Hot Cars is a 1956 American film noir crime film directed by Don McDougall and written by Don Martin and Richard H. Landau. The film stars John Bromfield, Carol Shannon, Joi Lansing, Ralph Clanton, Mark Dana, Charles Keane and George Sawaya. It was released on November 2, 1956, by United Artists.

Plot
Nick Dunn, a used car salesman, can't close a deal with customers Karen Winter and Arthur Markel, so he is fired. A sympathetic Markel has a car lot of his own and offers a job to Nick, who quits after discovering Markel's disreputable sales methods.

Nick and wife Jane have a financial dilemma when their son falls ill. Swallowing his pride, Nick asks for his job back with Markel, who promotes him to manager. But the criminal activity continues, until Nick becomes convinced that Markel has even ordered his henchman, Smiley Ward, to murder Davenport, a detective.

Jane is appalled by Nick's new line of work. He seeks solace in the company of the beautiful Karen, but when the cops come to investigate Davenport's death, Karen refuses to give Nick an alibi. Now a suspect, he tracks down Ward, who during their struggle at an amusement park falls from a roller coaster to his death. Nick tries to explain the hot-car racket to the police, implicating Karen and Markel.

Cast 
John Bromfield as Nick Dunn
Carol Shannon as Jane Dunn
Joi Lansing as Karen Winter
Ralph Clanton as Arthur Markel
Mark Dana as Smiley Ward
Charles Keane as Lieutenant Jefferson
George Sawaya as Lt. Fred Holmes
Dabbs Greer as Detective Davenport
John Frederick as Hutton
Kurt Katch as Otto
Joan Sinclair as Miss Rogers
Robert Osterloh as 'Big John' Hayman
Maurice Marks as Paul the Bartender
Paula Hill as Mrs. Davenport

References

External links 
 
 Hot Cars at the American Film Institute Catalog of Feature Films

1956 films
Film noir
1956 crime films
American crime films
American drama films
United Artists films
Films about automobiles
1950s English-language films
Films directed by Don McDougall
1950s American films
American black-and-white films